"Give a Little Bit" is the opening song on Supertramp's 1977 album Even in the Quietest Moments... The song was released as a single that same year and became an international hit for the band, peaking at number 15 on the Billboard Pop Singles chart. It was a chart hit in the band's native UK, reaching number 29 on the UK Singles Chart. The single was re-released in 1992 to raise funds for the ITV Telethon Charity event, but failed to chart.

Its writing credits are given to Rick Davies and Roger Hodgson, although it is a Hodgson composition. Hodgson and Davies shared writing credits from 1974 until 1983, when Hodgson left Supertramp.

"Give a Little Bit" was first written by Hodgson when he was 19 or 20 years old before it was introduced to the band for recording five to six years later. Hodgson stated that the song was inspired by the Beatles' "All You Need Is Love", released during the love and peace movement of the 1960s.

Drummer Bob Siebenberg recounted that "Roger had been working at Malibu for quite a while on this tune. I'd hear the song in hotel rooms and places like that. He had the song on a little tape when I first joined the band so I was quite familiar with the tune. We tried out various drum things and it seemed right to ride it along on the snare drum […] giving it something almost like a train beat. So it's all on the snare and bass drum, with no tom-tom fills or anything."

Reception
Cash Box said that it "would be a great crack at a pop hit for any artist," that "the rhythm is gentle, yet persuasive; the harmonies are full of uplifting momentum" and "the lead vocal has a vulnerable quality similar to Peter Gabriel's work."  Record World praised "its easy, flowing style."  

Ultimate Classic Rock critic Nick DeRiso rated it as Supertramp's all time best song, calling it a "singalong paean to the Golden Rule."  Gary Graff of Billboard rated "Give a Little Bit" as Supertramp's 10th best song, praising its "chiming 12-string acoustic guitar and Hodgson’s keening vocals."

Live performances
"Give a Little Bit" was recorded to be released on the live album Paris, but the song was dropped because the band members found all the available recordings of the song to be of unacceptable quality.

After Hodgson had left Supertramp, the song was included in almost all his live performances. The song has also been performed by Hodgson during his tour with Ringo Starr & His All-Starr Band in 2001; a recording appears on the album Ringo Starr and Friends. On Sunday 1 July 2007, Roger Hodgson sang this song as his finale for his short set at the Concert for Diana, held at Wembley Stadium in London. Princess Diana loved the song, and Hodgson said of the performance in her honor: "It was very wonderful when the audience all stood up, and the princes also, to sing 'Give a Little Bit' with me. That was a magical moment." "Give a Little Bit" can also be found on Hodgson's album Classics Live, a collection of his live performances from acoustic, band and orchestra shows recorded on tour in 2010.

After Hodgson's departure from Supertramp, the band included the song for the first time in their set list in 2002 during their One More for the Road Tour. The song was sung by Jesse Siebenberg. They also played the song in their 70-10 Tour in 2010.

In popular culture
"Give a Little Bit" has been used in movies, such as Superman and commercials, such as for the Gap.  It has also been used in to encourage giving to charity drives.

Track listings

7" vinyl single (1977)

CD single (1990)

CD single (1992)

CD single (2012)
Give a Little Bit (with choir)

Charts

Weekly charts

Year-end charts

Certifications

Personnel
Credits listed by Matt Hurwitz of Mix. 
Roger Hodgson – 12-string acoustic guitars, 12-string Rickenbacker electric guitar, 6-string electric guitar, lead and backing vocals
Dougie Thomson – Fender Jazz Bass
Bob Siebenberg – drums and percussion
Rick Davies – clavinet, piano, organ
John Helliwell – saxophone

Goo Goo Dolls version

In 2004, American rock band Goo Goo Dolls covered the song, releasing it as a single in October of that year. It peaked at number 37 on the Billboard Hot 100 chart in February 2005. It was first covered (partially) in 2001, when guitarist and lead vocalist Johnny Rzeznik appeared in an ad for The Gap singing the song along with other artists. The song opened the live album Live in Buffalo: July 4th, 2004, and later appeared as a track on their hit album Let Love In. In May 2006, their version of "Give a Little Bit" was honored by the American Society of Composers, Authors and Publishers (ASCAP) in recognition of being one of the most played songs in the ASCAP repertoire in 2005.

Track listing

Charts

Release history

Other versions
In January 2005, cover versions produced and arranged by John Fields were recorded by John Ondrasik and UNICEF ambassadors Clay Aiken and India Arie. The covers were created as part of the "Kids Help Out" public service announcement campaign designed by Cartoon Network to inspire viewers to support relief efforts toward the victims of the 2004 Indian Ocean earthquake and tsunami. For the campaign, Hodgson also provided a new recording with an 80-piece orchestra and choir.

References

1977 singles
1977 songs
2004 singles
A&M Records singles
Clay Aiken songs
Five for Fighting songs
Goo Goo Dolls songs
India Arie songs
Rock ballads
Song recordings produced by Rob Cavallo
Songs written by Rick Davies
Songs written by Roger Hodgson
Supertramp songs
Warner Records singles